In architecture, brattishing or brandishing is a decorative cresting which is found at the top of a cornice or screen, panel or parapet. The design often includes leaves or flowers, and the term is particularly associated with Tudor architecture.

References
Frederic H Jones, The Concise Dictionary of Architectural and Design History,  
Harris, Illustrated Dictionary of Historic Architecture,

External links

Architectural elements